The Brenizer Library is a historic building in Merna, Nebraska. It was built in 1916-1917 by C.H. Empfield & Bert Elder thanks to a $6,500 donation from homesteader James G. Brenizer, and designed in the Prairie School and Classical Revival styles by architect Claude W. Way. It has been listed on the National Register of Historic Places since July 3, 2007.

References

Neoclassical architecture in Nebraska
Library buildings completed in 1917
Libraries on the National Register of Historic Places in Nebraska
National Register of Historic Places in Custer County, Nebraska
Prairie School architecture in Nebraska
1917 establishments in Nebraska